The 1944 Camberwell North by-election was a by-election held on 31 March 1944 for the British House of Commons constituency of Camberwell North.

The by-election was triggered by the elevation to the peerage of the town's Labour Member of Parliament (MP) Charles Ammon, who was ennobled as Baron Ammon.

The Labour candidate was Cecil Manning, who was unopposed by the other parties in the wartime coalition. The only other candidate was an independent, T. F. Disher, who had also contested the previous general election in 1935. The result was one of the lowest turnouts in a by-election on record: the number of available electors was estimated at around 8,000, and Manning was elected with just 2,655 votes against Disher's 674, a majority of just 1,981.

Results

References

See also 
 List of United Kingdom by-elections
 Camberwell North constituency

Camberwell North,1944
Camberwell North by-election
Camberwell North by-election
Camberwell North,1944
Camberwell